Christian Front may refer to:

Christian Front (South Africa)
Christian Front (United States)
Indian Christian Front
Irish Christian Front, founded in 1936
Christian Democratic Front, São Tomé and Príncipe
Christian Democratic Popular Front, Moldova
Christian World Liberation Front, known as the Spiritual Counterfeits Project